Dameronia was the name of a bebop jazz ensemble founded by Don Sickler and Philly Joe Jones in the 1980s that featured the original compositions and arrangements of Tadd Dameron. They recorded three albums, two for Uptown Records and the other for Soul Note Records,   and continued to perform even after Jones' death in 1985. The nonet, which included several of the composer's colleagues, attempted to create an "historically accurate" representation of Dameron's music.

Personnel
The original line-up included:
Johnny Coles, fluegelhorn
Don Sickler, trumpet, conducting, additional arranging;
Britt Woodman, trombone; 
Charles Davis, Frank Wess and Cecil Payne, saxophones
Walter Davis Jr., piano
Larry Ridley, bass
"Philly" Joe Jones, drums
Don Sickler and John Oddo, transcription

Later configurations included:

Virgil Jones, trumpet
Benny Powell, trombone
Clifford Jordan, tenor saxophone
Kenny Washington, drums (after Jones's passing)

Performances

Dameronia performed at various jazz clubs, concert halls and festivals,

 debuting in Greenwich Village at Lush Life in 1982. In 1988 Dameronia was featured in a concert at Jazz at Lincoln Center entitled "The Music of Tadd Dameron". The opening act was an all-star quartet featuring Tommy Flanagan, George Mraz, Kenny Washington and Charlie Rouse.

Discography

1982 To Tadd with Love (Uptown)
1983 Look Stop Listen (Uptown) with Johnny Griffin
1989 Live at the Theatre Boulogne (Soul Note)

References

Bebop ensembles
Hard bop ensembles
American jazz ensembles
Tribute bands
Musical groups established in 1982
Musical groups disestablished in 1985
1982 establishments in the United States
Uptown Records (jazz) artists